is a single by Japanese entertainer Akina Nakamori. Written by Kazuko Sakata, the single was released on November 10, 1986, by Warner Pioneer through the Reprise label. This was Nakamori's only single to be released exclusively on cassette format. It was also the lead single from her fourth compilation album Best II.

The single became Nakamori's 14th No. 1 on Oricon's weekly singles chart and sold over 61,700 copies.

Track listing

Charts

References

External links 
 
 

1986 singles
1986 songs
Akina Nakamori songs
Japanese-language songs
Warner Music Japan singles
Reprise Records singles
Oricon Weekly number-one singles